Abakumovo is a rural locality (a village) in Taskayevsky Selsoviet of Barabinsky District, Novosibirsk Oblast, Russia. The population was 103 as of 2010. There are 5 streets.

Geography 
Abakumovo is located 34 km southeast of Barabinsk (the district's administrative centre) by road. Karmyshak is the nearest rural locality.

History 
The village is based in 1932.

References 

Rural localities in Novosibirsk Oblast